The term administration, as used in the context of government, differs according to the jurisdiction under which it operates. In general terms, administration can be described as a decision making body.

United States

In American usage, the term generally refers to the executive branch under a specific president (or governor, mayor, or other local executive);  or the term of a particular executive; for example: "President Y's administration" or "Secretary of Defense X during President Y's administration."  It can also mean an executive branch agency headed by an administrator, as the National Aeronautics and Space Administration (NASA), Small Business Administration or the National Archives and Records Administration.

The term "administration" has been used to denote the executive branch in presidential systems of government.

Europe
The term's usage in Europe varies by country, but most typically the word "administration" refers to  managerial functions in general, which may include local governments, or the hierarchy of national and local government, that applies to a town or district. More specifically, it may refer to public administration, the business of administering public policy as determined by government. However, outside France and Romania, this usage of the word is uncommon.

For the British sense of the word, most countries use the term government, referring to the "administration" of Winston Churchill as the "Churchill government". This is also true for the non-European members of the Commonwealth of Nations.  An older, chiefly Commonwealth usage, is the term  "ministry", as in "Churchill Ministry", which is still in official and academic use in Britain, Australia and Canada to refer the terms of prime ministers.

Depending on the type of government, the word coalition may be used for a specific government. In the Netherlands, cabinet is the most-used term (as in "the fourth Balkenende cabinet"), although "coalition" or "government" are also used when one does not refer to a specific coalition (note that the two terms have slightly different meanings).

See also
 Executive (government)

References

Government institutions
Public administration